Heterolamium is a genus of plants in the family Lamiaceae, first described in 1965. The 2 known species are both endemic to China.

Species
Heterolamium debile (Hemsl.) C.Y.Wu - Hubei, Hunan, Shaanxi, Sichuan, Yunnan
Heterolamium flaviflorum (Z.Y.Zhu) L.Wei - Sichuan

References

Lamiaceae
Lamiaceae genera
Endemic flora of China